Samuel Medley may refer to:
 Samuel Medley (painter)
 Samuel Medley (minister)